Paul Alan Vojta (born September 30, 1957) is an American mathematician, known for his work in number theory on Diophantine geometry and Diophantine approximation.

Contributions
In formulating Vojta's conjecture, he pointed out the possible existence of parallels between the Nevanlinna theory of complex analysis, and diophantine analysis in the circle of ideas around the Mordell conjecture and abc conjecture. This suggested the importance of the integer solutions (affine space) aspect of diophantine equations.

Vojta wrote the .dvi-previewer xdvi.

Education and career
He was an undergraduate student at the University of Minnesota, where he became a Putnam Fellow in 1977, and a doctoral student at Harvard University (1983). He currently is a professor in the Department of Mathematics at the University of California, Berkeley.

Awards and honors
In 2012 he became a fellow of the American Mathematical Society.

Selected publications
 Diophantine Approximations and Value Distribution Theory, Lecture Notes in Mathematics 1239, Springer Verlag, 1987,

References

External links
Vojta's home page

1957 births
Living people
Arithmetic geometers
Putnam Fellows
Institute for Advanced Study visiting scholars
University of Minnesota alumni
Harvard University alumni
University of California, Berkeley faculty
20th-century American mathematicians
Fellows of the American Mathematical Society
International Mathematical Olympiad participants
21st-century American mathematicians